Donga is a Local Government Area in Taraba State, Nigeria. It has its headquarters in the town of Donga on the Donga River at.

Geography 
Donga has an area of 3,121 km and also serves as the home of the Donga river which flows through the LGA. The average temperature of Donga  is around 32 °C while the humidity level of the LGA is an average of 17 percent.

Population 
Donga has approximately 177, 900 population with the conglomeration of different tribes such as the Tiv, Chamba, the Ichen, the Hausa and the Fulani.

Religion  
The most widely practiced religions in Donga are Islam and Christianity.

Occupation 
The occupation of most of the inhabitants are farming, hunting, fishing, cattle rearing and trading.

Postal Code 
The postal code of the area is 671.

References 

Local Government Areas in Taraba State